Pilocrocis roxonalis is a moth in the family Crambidae. It was described by Herbert Druce in 1895. It is found in Panama and Costa Rica.

The forewings and hindwings are pale glossy brown, in some lights showing a purplish shade.

References

Pilocrocis
Moths described in 1895
Moths of Central America